Stenoptilia atlanticola is a moth of the family Pterophoridae. It is found in Morocco.

The wingspan is 25 mm. The forewings are brown and the hindwings are creamy brown.

References

Moths described in 1936
atlanticola
Endemic fauna of Morocco
Moths of Africa